Vipul Mehta (born 1990) is an Indian playback singer, originating from Amritsar, Punjab, India. He won the title of Indian Idol in season 6 of the show i.e. on 1 September 2012.

Vipul Mehta learned classical singing since he was 8 years old and is studying Mass Communications for a bachelor's degree. In 2008, he became a finalist in Amul STAR Voice of India in the programme's second season, but could not make it to the Final three. In 2012, he applied to Indian Idol 6 and won the sixth season with co-finalist Devendra Pal Singh, 17 becoming runner-up and Amit Kumar third. His debut single was "Rowaan Mein" written and composed by Asad Chohan and produced by Ali Mustafa. Following his win, he also released his debut album Hello Namaste Sat Sri Akal.

Spouse- Jyotisha kapoor (9th December 2015)

Discography

Film
 Khandaani Shafakhana (2019)

Album
2012: Hello Namaste Sat Sri Akal

Singles
2012: "Rowaan Mein"
2015: "Vande Mataram - A Tribute to Soldiers"

References
https://m.punjab.punjabkesari.in/amritsar/news/indian-idol-winner-vipul-mehta-get-married-421293

External links
Official website

Indian male singers
Living people
Indian Idol winners
1991 births
Musicians from Amritsar